State Route 16 (SR 16) is an east–west highway running from Columbus to Coshocton.  Its western terminus is at Civic Center Drive (formerly U.S. Route 33) in Downtown Columbus, and its eastern terminus is at US 36.  For much of its run through Licking County, and its entire run through Franklin County, State Route 16 follows the path of Columbus' Broad Street. West of Drexel Avenue in Bexley, the route is cosigned with U.S. Route 40 until its endpoint just east of the Scioto River.

History

The State Route 16 designation was originally applied to the routing carrying U.S. Route 422; when that route was created, SR 16 moved to the routing that had carried State Route 20. SR 16 was rerouted at its east end after the creation of US 36, then later truncated to Coshocton, with the eastern end becoming State Route 416.

Major intersections

References

016
Transportation in Coshocton County, Ohio
Transportation in Franklin County, Ohio
Transportation in Licking County, Ohio
Transportation in Muskingum County, Ohio